Karl-Heinz Feldkamp (born 2 June 1934) is a German retired football manager and player.

Feldkamp started coaching in 1968. In Germany, he coached Borussia Dortmund, 1. FC Kaiserslautern, and Eintracht Frankfurt, among others. He previously coached Galatasaray in 1992–93, and also coached another Istanbul club, Beşiktaş in 1999. During his 1992–93 tenure at the Istanbul club, Feldkamp helped Galatasaray establish a competitive squad with promising Turkish youngsters. These would-be stars included, but are not limited to: Hakan Şükür, Bülent Korkmaz, Hamza Hamzaoğlu, Tugay Kerimoğlu, and Mustafa Kocabey.

While manager of Kaiserslautern he won the 1989–90 DFB-Pokal, followed by the 1990–91 Bundesliga and the 1991 DFB-Supercup. He also won the DFB-Pokal in 1985 with Bayer Uerdingen and in 1988 with Eintracht Frankfurt. While managing in Turkey he guided Galatasaray to the 1992–93 1.Lig title and the 1992–93 Turkish Cup.

He is commonly referred to as "Kalli". Due to his direct and honest interaction with the Turkish media, Turkish newspapers often write about the "Kalli aphorisms."

In June 2007, he returned to Galatasaray by signing a two-year contract and replacing outgoing coach Erik Gerets. He was respected and elevated to the level of almost a "living legend" by Galatasaray supporters. He was known for his rigid "discipline" on and off the training pitch and did not differentiate between "star" and "team" players.

On 5 April 2008, Feldkamp resigned from Galatasaray due to a huge amount of disagreements between himself and the board. Galatasaray President Adnan Polat previously stated that, Feldkamp would not be Galatasaray coach for the 2008–09 season but was responsible for the reserve team and an advisor to the new coach. It was rumoured that his previous occasions with Lincoln and Hakan Şükür just before the derby game against Beşiktaş J.K., and recent modifications in the squad led to the resignation.

On 26 November 2008, Feldkamp officially returned to Galatasaray as the team consultant in order to assist the team manager Michael Skibbe.

References

External links
 Karl-Heinz Feldkamp at eintracht-archiv.de 
 

German footballers
Rot-Weiß Oberhausen players
German football managers
German expatriate football managers
Borussia Dortmund managers
1934 births
Living people
1. FC Kaiserslautern managers
Arminia Bielefeld managers
Eintracht Frankfurt managers
Beşiktaş J.K. managers
Galatasaray S.K. (football) managers
Süper Lig managers
Expatriate football managers in Egypt
Expatriate football managers in Turkey
Bundesliga managers
Footballers from Essen
KFC Uerdingen 05 managers
FC Gütersloh 2000 managers
SG Wattenscheid 09 managers
West German expatriate sportspeople in Egypt
German expatriate sportspeople in Turkey
Association football midfielders
Regionalliga players
West German footballers
West German football managers
West German expatriate football managers